The National Intelligence Cross is a decoration of the United States Intelligence Community (IC) awarded under the National Intelligence Awards (NIA) Program by the Office of the Director of National Intelligence (ODNI).  It is the highest award presented by the Office of the Director of National Intelligence.  It is equivalent of the Central Intelligence Agency's Distinguished Intelligence Cross.

Criteria
The National Intelligence Cross may be awarded to United States government civilian or military personnel who have gone above and beyond the call of duty in response to a threat to national security.  It is awarded for conspicuous gallantry, extraordinary heroism, and courage in the face of significant and known risk.

Appearance
The medal is a 24-karat goldplated triangular armed cross pattée,  inches across.  In the center of the cross is a pole star on a dark blue enameled disk, superimposed over a Sub rosa device.

It consists of wide edge stripes of scarlet, a stripe of white separated by a thin stripe of old glory blue, with central stripe of golden yellow bordered on each side by stripes of old glory blue.

See also
 Awards and decorations of the United States government

References

Cross
Awards established in 2008
Awards and decorations of the United States Director of National Intelligence
Intelligence